= Podchernikoff =

Podchernikoff is a surname. Notable people with the surname include:

- Alexis Angelo Podchernikoff (1912-1987), American lithographer
- Alexis Matthew Podchernikoff (1886-1933), American painter
