= Alexis Angelo Podchernikoff =

American lithographer

- Born: 1912
- Died: 1987 (aged 74–75)
- Occupation: Painter
- Parent: Alexis Matthew Podchernikoff

Alexis Angelo Podchernikoff (1912-1987) was an American lithographer. His work is at the Fine Arts Museums of San Francisco.
