= Alexis Matthew Podchernikoff =

American painter

- Born: 1886
- Died: 1933 (aged 46–47)
- Occupation: Painter
- Children: Alexis Angelo Podchernikoff

Alexis Matthew Podchernikoff (March 17, 1886 - October 31, 1933) was an American painter. His work is at the Oakland Museum of California.
